Kobayr is a village in the Tumanyan Municipality of the Lori Province of Armenia. The village had a de jure population of 15 on 1 January 2022. Kobayr Monastery is near the village.

References 

Populated places in Lori Province